Homelix klingi is a species of beetle in the family Cerambycidae. It was described by Kolbe in 1893. It is known from the Central African Republic, Sierra Leone, the Ivory Coast, Kenya, the Democratic Republic of the Congo, Mali, Tanzania, Cameroon, Togo, and Zambia.

References

Phrynetini
Beetles described in 1893